Æðaklettar (also known as Æðarkletta ) is an island of Iceland.

References

Islands of Iceland